Sebatik Island (Indonesian/Malay: Pulau Sebatik) is an island off the eastern coast of Borneo, partly within Indonesia and partly within Malaysia. It is one of the 92 officially listed outlying islands of Indonesia.

Sebatik Island lies between Tawau Bay (Teluk Tawau) to the north and Sibuku Bay (Teluk Sibuku) to the south. The town of Tawau lies in Sabah just to the north. The island is bisected at roughly 4° 10' north by the Indonesia–Malaysia border - the northern part belongs to Sabah, Malaysia (Sebatik Malaysia) while the southern part belongs to North Kalimantan (previously East Kalimantan), Indonesia (Sebatik Indonesia).

Sebatik Malaysia has a population estimated to be approximately 25,000; there were 47,571 people in Sebatik Indonesia as at the 2020 Census.

The demarcated international border between Malaysia and Indonesia stops at the eastern edge of Sebatik Island, so that the ownership of Unarang Rock and the maritime area located to the east of Sebatik is unclear. This is one of the reasons why the Ambalat region waters and crude oil deposits east of Sebatik Island have been the centre of an active maritime dispute between Indonesia and Malaysia since March 2005.  The ambiguity of the border at the eastern edge also caused a dispute over two nearby islands of Sipadan and Ligitan, both south of  4° 10' N but administered by Malaysia. The territorial dispute was resolved by the International Court of Justice in 2002 which awarded the islands to Malaysia.

While there are border guards on the island, there is no immigration office, no customs house, no barbed-wire fence and no walls demarcating the border. Instead, the only evidence of a border are the concrete piles buried every kilometre from east to west.

Sebatik Island was one of the places in which heavy fighting took place between Indonesian troops and Malaysian troops during the 1963 Indonesia–Malaysia confrontation.

The North Borneo Timbers company operated a logging concession on the island until the 1980s and its mostly expatriate employees lived in a self-contained community in Wallace Bay. Sebatik Malaysia is within the administrative division of Tawau. For electoral purposes, Sebatik falls within the parliamentary constituency of Kalabakan and the state assembly district of Sebatik.

Attractions
In the village of Sungai Haji Kuning, there exists a house known as the "Two Country House Tour" that is divided by the Malaysian-Indonesian border. Further along the border, within Pancang as well, a public swimming pool known as "North Sebatik Swimming Pool" bisects the international border.

See also

 List of divided islands
 List of islands of Malaysia
 List of islands of Indonesia
 Line house

References

Islands of Sabah
Divided regions
International islands
Islands of Kalimantan
Landforms of North Kalimantan
Populated places in Indonesia